Jesús Enrique Velasco Muñoz (born 16 January 1972 in Madrid) is a Spanish retired footballer who played as a right back.

Honours
Spain U21
UEFA European Under-21 Championship third place: 1994

References

External links

Sporting Gijón biography 

1972 births
Living people
Footballers from Madrid
Spanish footballers
Association football defenders
La Liga players
Segunda División players
Segunda División B players
Tercera División players
Real Madrid Castilla footballers
Real Madrid CF players
Sporting de Gijón players
UD Salamanca players
CD Numancia players
Las Rozas CF players
UD San Sebastián de los Reyes players
Spain youth international footballers
Spain under-21 international footballers